Vasyl Hryhorovych Melnychuk (born 18 February 1957) is a former Soviet–Ukrainian football referee. He is the head of the committee of referees of the Football Federation of Ukraine. Melnychuk is one of the top referees of the Ukrainian Premier League. He also officiated at international matches.

In 1979, Melnychuk graduated from the Odessa Engineer-Construction Institute.

Key games
 1999 Ukrainian Cup Final
 2001 Ukrainian Cup Final
 2002 Ukrainian Cup Final

External links
 Profile at allplayers.in.ua
 Profile at scoreshelf.com
 Profile at the Referees Committee of Ukraine

1957 births
Living people
Ukrainian football referees
Soviet football referees
Sportspeople from Donetsk Oblast